Apocalypse is the twelfth studio album by German heavy metal band Primal Fear. The album was released on 10 August 2018 via Frontiers Records. It is also the second and last album with drummer Francesco Jovino.

Track listing

Personnel 
Ralf Scheepers – vocals
Mat Sinner – bass, vocals
Magnus Karlsson – guitars, keyboards
Alex Beyrodt – guitars
Tom Naumann – guitars
Francesco Jovino – drums

Charts

References 

2018 albums
Frontiers Records albums
Primal Fear (band) albums